Yurdakul (literally "servant of the homeland") is a Turkish surname and may refer to:
 Cevat Yurdakul (1942–1979), Turkish prosecutor
 Doğan Yurdakul (1946–2017), Turkish journalist and writer
 Mehmet Emin Yurdakul (1869–1944), Turkish nationalist writer and politician, member of Turkish volleyball league.

Turkish-language surnames